was a village located in Hiroo District, Tokachi Subprefecture, Hokkaido, Japan.

As of 2004, the village had an estimated population of 1,802 and a density of 13.10 persons per km2. The total area was 137.54 km2.

On February 6, 2006, Chūrui was merged into the expanded town of Makubetsu (in Nakagawa (Tokachi) District).

External links
 Makubetsu official website 

Dissolved municipalities of Hokkaido
Makubetsu, Hokkaido